WIAR may refer to:

 WIAR-LP, a low-power radio station (100.5 FM) licensed to Hilton Head Island, South Carolina, United States
 WIAR (Kentucky), a defunct radio station located in Paducah, Kentucky, United States that was licensed from 1922-1924

See also 
 Wiar, a river in Poland and Ukraine